In 18th- and 19th-century Italy, the cicisbeo (plural: cicisbei) or  was the man who was the professed gallant or lover of a woman married to someone else. With the knowledge and consent of the husband, the cicisbeo attended his mistress at public entertainments, to church and other occasions, and had privileged access to this woman. The arrangement is comparable to the Spanish cortejo or estrecho and, to a lesser degree, to the French petit-maître. The exact etymology of the word is unknown; some evidence suggests it originally meant "in a whisper" (perhaps an onomatopeic word). Other accounts suggest it is an inversion of bel cece, which means "beautiful chick (pea)". According to the Oxford English Dictionary, the first recorded usage of the term in English was found in a letter by Lady Mary Wortley Montagu dated 1718. The term appears in Italian in Giovanni Maria Muti's Quaresimale Del Padre Maestro Fra Giovanni Maria Muti De Predicatori of 1708 (p. 734).

Social importance
This arrangement, called the cicisbeatura or cicisbeismo, was widely practised, especially among the nobility of the Italian cities of Genoa, Nice, Venice, Florence and Rome. While many contemporary references to cicisbei and descriptions of their social standing exist, scholars diverge on the exact nature of the phenomenon. Some maintain that this institution was defined by marriage contracts, others question this claim and see it as a peculiarity of 18th-century customs that is not well defined or easily explained. Other scholars see it as a sign of the increasing emancipation of aristocratic women in the 18th century.

The cicisbeo was better tolerated if he was known to be homosexual. Louise d'Épinay wrote from Paris to her friend Ferdinando Galiani about the impending departure of marchese Alvise Mocenigo, the Venetian ambassador, whose tastes the ambassador had displayed in Paris:

Regardless of its roots and technicalities, the custom was firmly entrenched. Typically, husbands tolerated or even welcomed the arrangement: Lord Byron, for example, was cicisbeo to Teresa, Contessa Guiccioli. After Byron's death, the Contessa's second husband, the Marquis de Boissy, was known to brag about the fact, introducing her as "Madame la Marquise de Boissy, autrefois la Maitresse de Milord Byron" (the Marquise de Boissy, formerly the mistress of Lord Byron). Byron also famously analyzed the institution from an English point of view in his poem Beppo. Attempts by the husband to ward off prospective cicisbei or disapproval of the practice in general was likely to be met with ridicule and scorn:

Cicisbei played by set rules, generally avoiding public displays of affection. At public entertainments, they would typically stand behind their seated mistress and whisper in her ear. Customs of the time did not permit them to engage in relationships with any other women during their free time, making the arrangement rather demanding. Either party could decide to end the relationship at any time. A woman's former cicisbei were called spiantati (literally penniless, destroyed), or cast-offs.

In the arts
The topic can be found in the contemporary poem Il Giorno (1763) by Giuseppe Parini. Other works from the period which make good (subjectively) use of the topic include:
 Così fan tutte Act II scene 1 (1790), an opera  by Wolfgang Amadeus Mozart
 The Antiquarian's Family (1749), a comedy by Carlo Goldoni
 L'italiana in Algeri (1813) and Il turco in Italia (1788), operas by Gioachino Rossini
 La Tosca (1887), play by Victorien Sardou, the basis of the opera Tosca by Giacomo Puccini
 Beppo (1817), a poem by Lord Byron.

See also
 Chaperone
 Courtly love
 Cuckoldry
 Gigolo
 Mistress
 Polyandry

References
Citations

Bibliography

 Marzio Barbagli, Sotto lo stesso tetto: Mutamenti della famiglia in Italia dal XV al XX secolo, (Bologna, 2000)
 Roberto Bizzocchi, "Cicisbei: La morale italiana," Storica 3 (1997)
 Roberto Bizzocchi.  A Lady's Man: The Cicisbei, Private Morals and National Identity in Italy.  Translated by Noor Giovanni Mazhar. Houndmills, Basingstoke, Hampshire  Palgrave Macmillan, 2014.  320 pp. 
 Jeremy Black, Italy and the Grand Tour, (New Haven, Conn., 2003)
 James Boswell, Boswell on the Grand Tour: Italy, Corsica, and France 1765–1766, Frank Brady, ed. (New York, 1955)
 Carla Pellandra Cazzoli, "Dames et sigisbées: Un début d'emancipation feminine?". Studies on Voltaire and the Eighteenth Century 193 (1980)
 John Forsyth, Remarks on the Antiquities, Arts, and Letters during an Excursion in Italy in 1802 and 1803, 2nd edn., (London, 1816)
 Barbara Hodgson, Italy Out of Hand: A Capricious Tour, Chronicle Books LLC, 2005
 J.G. Krünitz (ed.), Oekonomische Encyklopädie oder allgemeines System der Staats- Stadt- Haus- und Landwirthschaft, Volume 8, 1776. Cicisbeo. Retrieved on March 27, 2006
 
 Jean Charles Léonard Simonde de Sismondi, Histoire des Républiques Italiennes du Moyen Age, 5th edn., vol. 8 (1807–1818; Brussels, 1839)
 Tobias Smollett, Travels through France and Italy, numerous editions.

External links

18th century in Italy
19th century in Italy